John Preston, 1st Baron Tara (4 November 1764 – 18 July 1821), was an Irish politician.

Preston was the son of John Preston, a descendant of a younger brother of Thomas Preston, 1st Viscount Tara, second son of Christopher Preston, 4th Viscount Gormanston. He inherited Bellinter House.

He was elected to the Irish House of Commons as one of two representatives for Navan in 1783 (aged only 18), a seat he held until the Irish Parliament was abolished in 1800. He was raised to the Peerage of Ireland the same year as Baron Tara, of Bellinter in the County of Meath, a reward for his support for the Union.

Lord Tara was childless and the title became extinct on his death in July 1821, aged 56.

References

1764 births
1821 deaths
Barons in the Peerage of Ireland
Peers of Ireland created by George III
Members of the Parliament of Ireland (pre-1801) for County Meath constituencies
Irish MPs 1783–1790
Irish MPs 1790–1797
Irish MPs 1798–1800
Members of the Privy Council of Ireland